Culladia achroellum is a species of grass moth of the family Crambidae. It is found in Africa from Sudan to South Africa and on the Indian Ocean islands.

It's got a length of approx. 9–10 mm and a wingspan of 18–20 mm.

References

External links
"Culladia achroellum, (Mabille, 1900)". African Moths. Retrieved December 4, 2017. Archived link January 16, 2013.

Moths described in 1900
Crambini
Moths of Madagascar
Lepidoptera of the Democratic Republic of the Congo
Moths of Mauritius
Lepidoptera of Ethiopia
Lepidoptera of Tanzania
Moths of Réunion
Moths of Sub-Saharan Africa